Cell migration-inducing and hyaluronan-binding protein (CEMIP), formerly known as KIAA1199, is a protein that in humans is encoded by the CEMIP gene. CEMIP has been shown to bind hyaluronic acid and catalyze its depolymerization independently of CD44 and hyaluronidases. Such function has been also been validated in mice.

CEMIP is associated with nonsyndromic deafness, as well as a variety of cancers.

References

Further reading

Extracellular matrix remodeling enzymes